Marchwiel is a suburb of Timaru, Canterbury, New Zealand. It is one of 24 suburbs within the Timaru District.

Marchwiel is in the Rangitata parliamentary electorate and is represented by Jo Luxton of the New Zealand Labour Party.

History 
In 1879, the Marchwiel Estate was sold by Philip Bouverie Luxmoore, as reported by The Timaru Herald. The estate was named for Luxmoore's home village of Marchwiel, North Wales. Luxmoore lends his name to Luxmoore Road and the St. Philip and All Saints Anglican Church in the suburb. The estate was destroyed in a fire in the 1960s.

Demographics

Marchwiel had a population of 3,507 at the 2018 New Zealand census, an increase of 240 people (7.3%) since the 2013 census, and an increase of 276 people (8.5%) since the 2006 census. There were 1,383 households. There were 1,734 males and 1,770 females, giving a sex ratio of 0.98 males per female, with 699 people (19.9%) aged under 15 years, 696 (19.8%) aged 15 to 29, 1,377 (39.3%) aged 30 to 64, and 735 (21.0%) aged 65 or older.

Ethnicities were 88.4% European/Pākehā, 11.1% Māori, 3.2% Pacific peoples, 4.6% Asian, and 1.5% other ethnicities (totals add to more than 100% since people could identify with multiple ethnicities).

The proportion of people born overseas was 11.9%, compared with 27.1% nationally.

Although some people objected to giving their religion, 51.3% had no religion, 37.3% were Christian, 0.8% were Hindu, 0.3% were Muslim, 0.1% were Buddhist and 2.0% had other religions.

Of those at least 15 years old, 240 (8.5%) people had a bachelor or higher degree, and 822 (29.3%) people had no formal qualifications. The employment status of those at least 15 was that 1,278 (45.5%) people were employed full-time, 345 (12.3%) were part-time, and 123 (4.4%) were unemployed.

Education 
Mountainview High School is a secondary school serving years 9 to 13 with a roll of  students. It started as Timaru Technical School in 1901, and was renamed Timaru Technical College in 1918. In 1934, it was renamed again to Timaru Technical High School, and in 1967 it became Timaru College. It was divided in 1984 into a technical institure (later called Aoraki Polytechnic) and a secondary school, Mountainview High, on a new site.

Oceanview Heights was formed in 2004 from the merger of Marchwiel School (established 1950) with Washdyke School (established 1874). Grantlea Downs was formed in 2005 when Grantlea School (established 1959) merged with Seadown School (established 1890).

St Joseph's started in 1939, merging in 1970 with St Mary's, another Catholic school opened in 1958, forming senior and junior campuses on the two sites. The school became integrated into the state system in 1983 and the sites were combined in 1984.

All these schools are co-educational. Rolls are as of

References 

Suburbs of Timaru